Conus is a genus  of predatory sea snails, or cone snails, marine gastropod mollusks in the family Conidae. Prior to 2009, cone snail species had all traditionally been grouped into the single genus Conus. However, Conus is now more precisely defined, and there are several other accepted genera of cone snails. For a list of the currently accepted genera, see Conidae.

Description
The thick shell of species in the genus Conus sensu stricto, is obconic, with the whorls enrolled upon themselves. The spire is short, smooth or tuberculated. The narrow aperture is elongated with parallel margins and is truncated at the base. The operculum is very small  relative to the size of the shell. It is corneous, narrowly elongated, with an apical nucleus, and the impression of
the muscular attachment varies from one-half to two-thirds of the inner surface. The outer lip shows a slight sutural sinus.

Distribution and habitat
Species in the genus Conus sensu stricto can be found in the tropical and subtropical seas of the world, at depths ranging from the sublittoral to 1,000 m. They are very variable in some of their characters, such as the tuberculation of the spire and body whorl, striae, colors and the pattern of coloring. Many fossil species have been described; they are extensively distributed, and first appear in Cretaceous strata.

See also
 Cone snail: general characteristics.

References

 Röckel, D., Korn, W. & Kohn, A.J. 1995. Manual of the Living Conidae. Volume 1: Indo-Pacific Region. Wiesbaden : Hemmen 517 pp.
 Filmer R.M. (2001). A Catalogue of Nomenclature and Taxonomy in the Living Conidae 1758 - 1998. Backhuys Publishers, Leiden. 388pp.
 Tucker J.K. (2009). Recent cone species database. September 4, 2009 Edition
 Tucker J.K. & Tenorio M.J. (2009) Systematic classification of Recent and fossil conoidean gastropods. Hackenheim: Conchbooks. 296 pp
 Monnier E., Limpalaër L., Robin A. & Roux C. (2018). A taxonomic iconography of living Conidae. Harxheim: ConchBooks. 2 vols. 1205 pp.page(s): 345 
 Puillandre N., Duda T.F., Meyer C., Olivera B.M. & Bouchet P. (2015). One, four or 100 genera? A new classification of the cone snails. Journal of Molluscan Studies. 81: 1-23

Further reading

External links 
 

 
Conidae
Extant Eocene first appearances
Gastropod genera